The 1926 Dunbartonshire by-election was held on 29 January 1926.  The by-election was held due to the appointment to the court of session of the incumbent Conservative MP, David Fleming.  It was won by the Conservative candidate John Thom.

References

Dunbartonshire by-election
1920s elections in Scotland
Politics of the Dunbartonshire
Dunbartonshire by-election
Dunbartonshire by-election
By-elections to the Parliament of the United Kingdom in Scottish constituencies